SWAPO for Justice, a splinter group of SWAPO in Namibia, was founded on 4 May 1995. SWAPO-J was led by Sakari Njoba Nghewete. SWAPO-J's cadre was mainly made up by former combatants of SWAPO, dissatisfied with their condition in independent Namibia.

References
D. Pal S. Ahluwalia, Paul F. Nursey-Bray. The Post-colonial Condition: Contemporary Politics in Africa. Nova Publishers, Jan 1, 1997  pg. 231

Defunct political parties in Namibia
Political schisms
SWAPO